Rapide can refer to:

de Havilland Dragon Rapide, a British short-haul passenger airplane
Vincent Rapide, a British 998cc v-twin cylinder motorcycle made from 1936–1955
Cars built by Aston Martin:
Aston Martin Rapide - concept car exhibited in 2006, production car from 2010
Lagonda Rapide - production car from 1961–1964
 "Rapide" (song), a 2020 song by Italian singer Mahmood
 National Express Rapide, a brand of express coach once used by National Express
 Rapide, an architecture description language developed by David Luckham at Stanford University